Thomas Deligiannis (Greek: Θωμάς Δεληγιάννης; born 20 January 1962) is a retired Greek football defender.

References

1962 births
Living people
Greek footballers
Pierikos F.C. players
Iraklis Thessaloniki F.C. players
Super League Greece players
Association football defenders
Greece international footballers